East Village may refer to:

Places

Canada
Downtown East Village, Calgary, Alberta
East Village, Nova Scotia

United Kingdom
East Village, Devon, a hamlet in Sandford parish
East Village, Glamorgan, an area of Cowbridge, Vale of Glamorgan
East Village, London, a housing development in Stratford

United States
East Village, Connecticut, a census-designated place
East Village, Des Moines, Iowa, a historical neighborhood
East Village, Flint, a neighborhood on the East Side of Flint, Michigan
East Village, Kansas City, a neighborhood in downtown Kansas City, Missouri
East Village, Long Beach, California, a neighborhood
East Village, Manhattan, a neighborhood in New York City
East Village, San Diego, a neighborhood in downtown San Diego
East Village, a neighborhood in the Lincoln Oval Village of Visalia, California
East Village, The nickname/former name of East Longmeadow, Massachusetts.

Other
 Beijing East Village in China

Other uses
East Village (band), a cult independent band from England

See also
East Villager, a former New York City monthly neighborhood newspaper